The following is an incomplete list of national war cemeteries of Polish soldiers around the world. Unless stated otherwise, the cemeteries include the graves of the World War II veterans.

Belgium
 Lommel (Haltstraat) 
 Oostende

France
 Langannerie (Grainville-Langannerie)

Germany
 Altengrabow (Stalag XI-A, cemetery demolished by the Red Army)
 Bay of Lübeck (5 wreck cemeteries with 352 Polish victims of SS Cap Arcona)
 Bergen Belsen (1414 graves)
 Berlin (several dozen cemeteries)
 Braunschweig
 Bremen, Osterholz (several hundred graves)
 Buchenwald
 Dachau
 Darmstadt
 Dora
 Dössel (139 officers of Oflag VI B)
 Eisenhüttenstadt
 Esslingen am Neckar
 Flensburg
 Flossenbürg
 Frankfurt, Hauptfriedhof (more than 650 graves)
 Fulda
 Fürstenau (44 graves of soldiers of Polish 1st Independent Parachute Brigade)
 Giessen
 Görlitz
 Grafeneck
 Hadamar (victims of T4 programme)
 Hamburg, Main Cemetery Ohlsdorf
 Hannover (7 different cemeteries)
 Heide
 Heidelberg (47 graves)
 Heilbronn
 Herford
 Hinzert
 Itzehoe
 Jacobsthal (municipality of Zeithain, in Saxony) 44 Poles from the 1944 Warsaw Uprising, prisoners in Stalag IV-B/Z, Zeithain, buried in the Polish section of the Italian Cemetery.  After the war, under Soviet domination, the area was a tank-driving training ground and artillery firing range, and the cemetery was obliterated.  In 2004, the 44 Polish (and a dozen Serbian) graves were located, and the remains transferred to an existing cemetery in Neuburxdorf (Bad Liebenwerda, in Brandenburg) (see below in this list)
 Karlsruhe (96 graves)
 Kassel
 Kiel (Nordfriedhof 9 airmen, Eichhoffriedhof several dozen graves)
 Kochendorf
 Lich (45 graves)
 Lower Saxony (Nedersachsen) - several cemeteries not listed here.
 Ludwigsburg
 Ludwigshafen (172 graves)
 Lübeck, Vorwerk cemetery (220 graves)
 Lüneburg
 Mainz (officers of Oflag XII-B)
 Mannheim (ca. 200 graves)
 Moringen
 Murnau (49 graves of Oflag VII-A)
 Neuburxdorf (Bad Liebenwerda in Brandenburg) a number of Polish POWs from nearby Stalag IV-B Mühlberg; in 2004, 44 Polish graves were transferred here from Jacobsthal (see above in this list)
 Neue Bremm
 Neuengamme
 Neuhaus
 Neumarkt
 Neumünster
 Nordhausen
 Oranienburg
 Osthofen
 Ostfriesland (36 cemeteries of the Polish 1st Armoured Division)
 Perl
 Prenzlau
 Ravensbrück
 Reichswalde-Kleve (63 airmen and 8 paras)
 Reichswald Forest
 Reutlingen (29 graves)
 Riegelsberg
 Rodgal
 Rensburg
 Saarbrücken
 Sachsenhausen
 Sage near Oldenburg (20 graves)
 Salzgitter
 Salzwedel
 Sandbostel (POW camp)
 Schleswig
 Stukenbrock
 Stuttgart (131 graves)
 Tangerhütte (cemetery demolished, number of victims unknown)
 Tübingen
 Wetzlar
 Wiesbaden (33 cemeteries in and around the town)
 Wildflecken (Kreuzweg der Nationen - 116 adults and 428 children who died shortly after liberation)
 Wolfenbüttel
 Worms (7 graves)

Iran
 Bandar Anzali (formerly Pahlevi, 639 graves)
 Esfahan (New Julfa, 18 graves)
 Tehran (Doulab, 1937 graves) (Beheshtieh Jewish Cemetery, 56 graves)
 Ahwaz (102 graves)
 Qazvin (40 graves) (as from 2008, no longer exists)
 Mashad (29 graves)
 Khoramshahr (5 graves)

Iraq
 Khanaqin/Alwand (437 Polish soldiers. All headstones destroyed)

Italy
 San Lazzaro near Bologna (1432 soldiers)
 Polish Soldier Cemetery @ Casamassina (430 soldiers)
 Loreto (1081 soldiers)
 Polish Soldier Cemetery @ Monte Cassino (1072 soldiers)

Libya
Tobruk (Graves destroyed by revolutionist.)

Netherlands
 Arnhem Oosterbeek War Cemetery
 Breda (161 soldiers)
 Ginneken 
 Goirle War Cemetery
Erehof Lemmer
 Axel (22 soldiers)

Russia

 Buzuluk near Orenburg
 Katyn 
 Koltubanka
 Krasnovodsk
 Mednoye, Tver Oblast
 Orenburg
 Tatishchevo
 Tatishchev Bor
 Totskoye

Kazakhstan
 Lugova
 Lugovaya
 Mankent
 Merke
 Shokpak 
 Vysokoye

Kyrgyzstan
 Jalal Abad

Turkmenistan
 Ashgabat
 Krasnovodsk

Ukraine
 Kharkov
 Lviv

Uzbekistan
 Bukhara
 Chirakchi 
 Guzar
 Jyzakh
 Karshi
 Katta Alekseyevskaya 
 Kanimekh 
 Karmana (2 cemeteries)
 Karkin-Batash
 Kitab 
 Margelan
 Narpai
 Olmazor (2 cemeteries; formerly Vrevskaya))
 Samarkand
 Shakhrisabz 
 Tashkent
 Yakkobag 
 Yangi-Yul

Tanzania
 Tengeru (near Arusha)

United Kingdom
Memorials and cemeteries:

Furthermore, two such graves are at Yatesbury, near Swindon, Wiltshire.

 
War cemeteries
Polish
Polish